WeProtect Global Alliance (also known as the Alliance) is a global alliance that brings together experts from government, the private sector and civil society to protect children from sexual abuse online.

History

On 22 July 2013, then-Prime Minister David Cameron made a speech regarding the proliferation and accessibility of child abuse images on the Internet and about cracking down on online pornography. The Prime Minister announced that a new UK-US taskforce would be created to lead a global alliance of the biggest Internet companies to tackle indecent images of children online.  Joanna Shields, then the Prime Minister's advisor for digital industries, would head up this initiative, working with the UK and US governments, law enforcement agencies and the technology industry to maximise the international efforts.

In October 2013, it was announced that Damian Green, HMG Minister for Policing, Criminal Justice and Victims would be travelling to the US with Joanna Shields to formalise arrangements for the task force and to meet with the US Attorney General and leading internet companies.

On 18 November 2013 the Prime Minister hosted an Internet Safety Summit  at No 10 Downing Street with Joanna Shields to discuss what is being done to block child abuse content and protect children from harmful material online. Participants, including leading search engines, internet service providers, the National Crime Agency, Internet Watch Foundation and the NSPCC, discussed how to rid the internet of child sexual abuse and exploitation. After the summit, the Internet safety communiqué  was issued, setting out the agreed-upon action.

On 13 December 2013, Policing Minister Damian Green, US Acting Assistant Attorney General Mythili Raman and Joanna Shields launched the first meeting of the US-UK taskforce to Counter Online Child Exploitation’. Over the next year, as chair of the taskforce, Joanna Shields was responsible for bringing together experts in government, industry, law enforcement and academia from both sides of the Atlantic to combat child sexual exploitation crimes on the Internet and to reduce the volume of indecent images of children online.

In April 2014, Home Office Minister Damian Green addressed the NSPCC child safety conference  about the government's work to stamp out online sexual exploitation. He revealed that the government was working with major industry players Google and Microsoft on a pilot to make it even tougher for pedophiles to share child abuse images.

He also told the conference  that Google had launched a programme to embed their engineers in the Internet Watch Foundation. 
His speech encouraged Internet companies to innovate in order to fight online child sexual exploitation, and he announced that Joanna Shields would be leading an industry solutions event as part of the US-UK taskforce.  The event would bring together experts from across the technology sector to come up with innovative solutions to end the sharing of indecent images and the interacting of adults with children for sexual purposes online.

In May 2014, the industry solutions event (WePROTECT 2014 ) took place at Gray's Inn in London. In attendance were 67 technology specialists and innovators from 48 of the world's leading technology companies. The event was led by the National Crime Agency CEOP and the Home Office, delivered by Brandfuel and facilitated by PA Consulting. The solutions event started with a hackathon with leading internet, technology and cyber intelligence companies working to develop breakthrough technology concepts that could assist in the prevention and investigation of online child abuse and the protection of victims. The event successfully laid the foundation for a new model of collaboration across the industry, harnessing a diverse range of technical skills, knowledge and experience to tackle sharing indecent images and the grooming of children for sexual purposes.

The UK Prime Minister hosted the WePROTECT Global Summit in London in December 2014. The summit gathered government leaders, leading technology companies and civil society organisations to galvanise action to end online child sexual exploitation. The Home Secretary opened the summit, speaking about the scale of abuse and what the UK is doing to combat it.  The Prime Minister  was the keynote speaker on the second day.  Alongside a raft of measures and technical innovations to tackle those who use the Internet to view and share indecent images, the Prime Minister announced that the UK would work with UNICEF to develop a new global Child Protection Fund  and that the UK would be making a £50 million contribution to the fund over a five-year period.

Keith Bristow, Director General of the National Crime Agency, also spoke at the summit. He addressed the need for law enforcement, civil society and the technology industry to work together to minimise risk to children and maximise risk to offenders. Joanna Shields, the Prime Minister's Digital Adviser, spoke about the importance of the technology industry using its talents, skills and capacity for innovation to tackle online child exploitation. She also delivered a report on milestones by industry partners over the course of 2014.

Attendees also heard from executives from Microsoft, Google, EY and Visa, who presented their contributions to WePROTECT and pledged to continue developing the concepts that  emerged from May's workshop, including blocking the viewing of illegal material at the browser level, internet interaction risk scoring, a victim identification tool and a system for children to report self-generated indecent images.

It was also announced that the United Arab Emirates would be hosting another conference in 2015 to ensure that a global response comes to fruition.

At the end of the summit, four ambitious statements of action  were published; to date these have been signed by over 50 countries, 20 companies and 10 civil society organisations.

A follow-up WePROTECT Industry event  took place in September 2015. Speaking at the event, the UK Minister for Internet Safety & Security Baroness Joanna Shields  delivered a message of continued support for this initiative and the vital importance of the broad global coalition of the willing coming together to share information and collaborate on how best to protect children online.  Industry delegates also heard from representatives of the WePROTECT initiative, including Google, Facebook and Microsoft, on milestones achieved by each of the companies in preventing sexual abuse images appearing in search results, identifying online grooming and detecting and removing videos of children being abused.

On 16–17 November 2015, the United Arab Emirates hosted the second WePROTECT Global Summit in Abu Dhabi.

In May 2016, WePROTECT had merged with the Global Alliance Against Child Sexual Abuse Online “to create, for the first time, a single organisation with the influence, expertise and resources to transform how online child sexual exploitation is dealt with worldwide”.

In July 2016, the WeProtect Global Alliance launched a new Fund to End Violence Against Children at the United Nations to deliver a global program of capacity and capability, with an initial donation of £40 million from the UK government. The Fund is hosted by UNICEF, and the WePROTECT Global Alliance Board are responsible for advising how to prioritize its activities for maximum impact.

In May 2017, at a press conference in Rome, the Pontifical Gregorian University, in collaboration with the Centre for Child Protection at its Institute of Psychology and in partnership with the WeProtect Global Alliance and Telefono Azzurro, announced that from 3–6 October 2017 it would host a world congress entitled 'Child Dignity in the Digital World'. They announced, "The invitation-only congress brings together distinguished academic experts, business leaders, leaders of civil society, high-level politicians and religious representatives from across the globe. This provides a historic opportunity to set the global agenda for the fight against online sexual child abuse and for child protection in the digital world".

Leadership
Leadership
 Ernie Allen - Chairman

Policy Board 
 Baroness Joanna Shields - CEO, BenevolentAI
 Maud de Boer-Buquicchio - former Special Rapporteur on The Sale Of Children, Child Prostitution and Child Pornography
 Joanna West/Alex Hurst - Joint Directors of Tackling Abuse and Exploitation, United Kingdom Home Office
 Steven J. Grocki - Chief, Child Exploitation and Obscenity Section, United States Department of Justice
 Antonio Labrador Jimenez - Team Leader, Fight Against Child Sexual Abuse, European Commission
 Lt Col. Dana Humaid Al Marzouqi - Director General of the International Affairs Bureau, United Arab Emirates Ministry of Interior 
 Jacqueline F. Beauchere - Chief Digital Safety Advocate, Microsoft
 Cornelius Williams - Global Chief of Child Protection, UNICEF
 Stephen Kavanagh - Executive Director of Police Services, INTERPOL
 H.E. Amira El Fadil - Commissioner for Social Affairs at the African Union Commission
 Julie Inman Grant - Australian eSafety Commissioner
 Julie Cordua - CEO, Thorn
 Brigitte De Lay - Director, Oak Foundation
 Gaurav Arya - Executive Director India, Children's Investment Fund Foundation
 Howard Taylor - Executive Director, Global Partnership to End Violence Against Children
 Dorothea Czarnecki - interim Executive Director, ECPAT International

References

External links
 

Anti–child pornography organizations
Children's charities based in England
Internet censorship in the United Kingdom
Computer security organizations
Internet-related organizations